Sespe Creek is located  in the southern Los Padres National Forest in Ventura County, Southern California. The stream winds over  through the Sierra Madre Mountains and Topatopa Mountains, foothills and valleys, and very narrow canyons and gorges

Geography
Sespe Creek headwaters are in Portero Seco of the Sierra Madre Mountains, and is formed by more than thirty tributary streams in those and the Topatopa Mountains, before its confluence with the Santa Clara River, in Fillmore. Sespe Creek is a National Scenic Waterway, and is one of the longest creeks untouched by dams or cement channels. The Sespe Wilderness Area protects a portion of its watershed and channel.

The Sespe Creek watershed is known for the  Sespe Condor Sanctuary. Established in 1947, it is where the critically endangered species Gymnogyps californicus (California condor) has been re-introduced into its native habitat.

Fish
At least twelve native and introduced fishes can be found in the creek:
Arroyo chub — Gila Orcutti
Pacific lamprey — Entosphenus tridentatus
Prickly sculpin
Santa Ana sucker — Catostomus santaanae
Steelhead trout — Oncorhynchus mykiss irideus
Threespine stickleback — Gasterosteus aculeatus
Green sunfish — Lepomis cyanellus, (introduced)
Fathead minnow (introduced)
Black bullhead (introduced) 
Mosquitofish (introduced)
Golden shiner (introduced)
 Threadfin shad (introduced)
 Rainbow trout (introduced)

A common fish in Sespe Creek is the Threespine stickleback (Gasterosteus aculeatus), which is easily identified by its three dorsal spines.

The Pacific lamprey (Entosphenus tridentatus) enters Sespe Creek from the Santa Clara River, a tributary of the Pacific Ocean.

The arroyo chub (Gila Orcutti) is often found in schools.  The Santa Ana sucker (Catostomus santaanae) is common around waterfalls.

The introduced species, Green sunfish (Lepomis cyanellus), can be found in shallow, weedy areas.

See also

California chaparral and woodlands
Fauna of the California chaparral and woodlands
California montane chaparral and woodlands
Riparian zone

References

Lists of fauna of California
Fish of the Western United States
Fauna of the California chaparral and woodlands
Natural history of Ventura County, California
+
Topatopa Mountains